Boone is an unincorporated community in Boone County, Nebraska, United States.

History
Boone took its name from Boone County, which was named for pioneer Daniel Boone. A post office was established at Boone in 1872, and remained in operation until 1994.

References

Populated places in Boone County, Nebraska
Unincorporated communities in Nebraska